Zenvo Automotive A/S is a Danish sports car manufacturer located in Præstø on the Danish Island of Zealand. It was founded by Troels Vollertsen, and the name 'Zenvo' is derived from a combination of the last four and first two letters in his last name.

History
Zenvo Automotive was founded in 2004. The first prototype of what became the Zenvo ST1 was completed in December 2008 and production began in 2009. Only 15 Zenvo ST1 cars were built and sold.

In April 2018, Bil Magasinet reported that despite Zenvo's feelings that their cars were too expensive for the home market, for the first time a Zenvo was sold to a Danish customer. It was a red Zenvo TSR-S, sold for DKK 10.5 million (US$1.65 million).

Models
 Zenvo ST1 (2009-2016) 
 Zenvo TS1 (2016–2019)
 Zenvo TS1 GT (2016–2019) Road-going grand tourer
 Zenvo TSR (2016–present) Track-only sports car
 Zenvo TSR-S (2018–present) Road-legal version of the TSR
 Zenvo TSR-GT (2022-present) 3 units of the last of the TSR series
 Zenvo *** (2023) V12 hybrid hypercar

References

External links

2010s cars
Danish companies established in 2004
Automotive motorsports and performance companies
Vehicle manufacturing companies established in 2004
Automotive companies of Denmark
Danish brands
Sports car manufacturers
Companies based in Vordingborg Municipality
Car manufacturers of Denmark